Gustav von Alvensleben (30 September 1803 – 30 June 1881) was a Prussian  General der Infanterie.

Biography

Early life
Alvensleben was born in Eichenbarleben in 1803, to the Low German noble family of Alvensleben. His parents were Gebhard Johann von Alvensleben (1773-1856), a Lieutenant-Colonel in the Royal Prussian Army, and his kinswoman Caroline Friederike Eleonore von Alvensleben (1773-1826). Gustav had four brothers; two of them, Werner and Constantin, would go on to serve in the military as generals.

Military career
Alvensleben joined the Prussian Army in 1821, serving in the Kaiser Alexander Guards Grenadiers Regiment No. 1 as a Second Lieutenant. In 1849, Alvensleben became Chief of Staff of the Prussian Corps in the insurrection in Baden and, in 1850, Chief of Staff of the VIII Army Corps. He went on to become the military governor of the Prussian Rhine Province and Westphalia in 1854, became a major-general in 1858, and the personal adjutant of King William I of Prussia in 1861. In this position he signed the Alvensleben Convention with Russia to co-ordinate Russian and Prussian politics throughout the Polish January Uprising.

Having served in the Royal headquarters in the Austro-Prussian War of 1866, Alvensleben led the peace negotiations with George V of Hanover. On 30 October 1866 he took over the command of the IV Corps. In 1868 Alvensleben was promoted to General der Infanterie and commanded the IV Corps in the Battles of Beaumont and Sedan during the Franco-Prussian War.

Alvensleben retired on 10 October 1872, and died unmarried and childless on 30 June 1881 in Gernrode.

Honours and awards

See also
 House of Alvensleben

References

1803 births
1872 deaths
People from Börde (district)
People from the Province of Saxony
German military personnel of the Franco-Prussian War
Prussian people of the Austro-Prussian War
Generals of Infantry (Prussia)
Recipients of the Pour le Mérite (military class)
Recipients of the Iron Cross (1870), 1st class
Knights Commander of the Order of Saint Stephen of Hungary
Commanders of the Military Order of Max Joseph
Grand Officiers of the Légion d'honneur
Grand Crosses of the Order of Aviz
Recipients of the Order of St. George of the Fourth Degree
Recipients of the Order of St. Vladimir, 2nd class
Gustav
Military personnel from Saxony-Anhalt